This is a list of international presidential trips made by Iván Duque, the 33th President of Colombia. President Duque has made 46 international trips to 24 countries since he assumed the presidency in August 2018. The official residence of the Colombian president is the House of Nariño in Bogotá

The number of visits per country where he traveled are:
 One visit to Argentina, Bolivia, Brazil, Belgium, China, El Salvador, Guatemala, Italy, Israel, Korea, Paraguay, Spain, United Arab Emirates, Vatican City
 Two visit to Mexico, Switzerland, United Kingdom
 Three visit to Chile, Panama, Peru, France
 Four visit to Ecuador
 Eight visit to United States

2018

2019

2020

2021

See also
2018 Colombian presidential election
President of Colombia

References 

Presidency of Iván Duque
Foreign relations of Colombia
2018 in international relations
2019 in international relations
2020 in international relations
2021 in international relations
Iván Duque
Colombia diplomacy-related lists
Iván Duque